Acharavadee Wongsakon is a Thai lay Buddhist teacher and former entrepreneur who teaches a form of Vipassana meditation called Techo Vipassana Meditation. She is the founder of the Knowing Buddha Organization, which campaigns against disrespectful uses of Buddha imagery and the general decline of morality in society. Acharvadee and the Knowing Buddha Foundation have been endorsed by the National Office of Buddhism.

Biography 
Acharavadee Wongsakon was born in Bangkok Thailand September 28, 1965. She is a Thai Buddhist Vipassana Meditation Master best known for her efforts in protecting Buddhism and raising awareness about the declining Buddhist morality in Thailand and globally.

Acharavadee took up mediation practice to help cope with the stresses of business life and celebrity. Vipassana Meditation practice lead Acharavadee to reevaluate her life and priorities and eventually withdrew herself from the social stage and business world.

Acharavadee sold her company, using the money to open the School of Life, a school for children, where  she became a Dhamma teacher, teaching children for free. “Respect is Common Sense” is the slogan of the organization, which views Buddha as the father of the Buddhist religion.
Acharavadee,  during 2006 visit to Buddha bar in Paris, witnessed the disrespect of the Image of Buddha in a popular night club, which prompted her to establish The Knowing Buddha Organization (KBO) to  raise global awareness that Buddha is the father of the Buddhist religion and Buddha's image should not be treated as decoration or used to promote the sale of alcohol. Some of the companies Knowing Buddha has cooperated with to stop the misuse of Buddha images as decoration are;  Louis Vuitton and Disney Pictures.
Other campaigns promoted by Acharavadee and the Knowing Buddha Organization is to bring awareness to the problem of accelerated climate change, resulting from the overuse of  cloud storage globally, fueled by selfie photos and exponential increase in cloud data storage on platforms such an Instagram and Facebook. Estimates are that by 2025 to use 1/5th world electrical consumption from cloud storage will reach 20% of total consumption.
Acharavadee is a bestselling author in Thailand and publishing both  in Thai and English language books on Buddhism and Buddhist Morality. Most notable works, “Awaken from the Madness” and “Top Ideas in Buddhism”.

Acharavadee's KBO Earth Climate campaign is aimed at reducing the global storage of unnecessary digital data generated daily.

Early life 

Acharavadee Wongsakon was born to Mr. Chaiyong and Mrs. Somjit Wongsakon,  on September 28, 1965 in Bangkok Noi District, Bangkok. Acharavadee enjoyed a simple upbringing Thai Family style in the Kingdom of Thailand near the banks of the Chao Phraya River in Bangkok.  Educated in public schools She attended Suwannaramwittayakom School and Sripatum University.

Career 
In 2005 Acharavadee established the Saint Tropez Diamond Company in Bangkok, and selling collection of high fashion jewelry inspired by the luxury and unique style of Saint Tropez, France.

In 2008 Acharavadee decided to sell her business and quietly withdraw from social life to devote her life to  teaching Buddhism, morality and practicing meditation. With proceeds from the sale of her business, Acharavadee  purchased land in central Bangkok and established the School of Life Foundation,  teaching Dhamma to children and teenagers without any charge. She taught children the importance of morality and to always rely their own experiences in life,  instead of memorizing from words in textbooks.
Acharavadee guided her students with the correct way of living and with right view towards the world.  Acharavadee's teachings at School of Life captured the interest of many in Thai Society, eventually leading her to open Mediation centers throughout Thailand aimed at teaching adult students these same values.

In 2011 Acharavadee Wongsakon began to teach the Techo Vipassana technique to students. After nine years, Acharavadee established Techo Vipassana Dhamma Path. Acharavadee purchased land at the foothills of Phra Phutthabat Noi in Kaeng Koi District, Saraburi Province, Thailand where she established her first Techo Vipassana retreat. Techo Vipassana is  meditation practice that follows the Four Foundations of Mindfulness practice, using the technique of igniting the fire element in the body to burn down Kilesa ( mental impurities).

Published books 
Meditation Master Acharavadee Wongsakon has published a number of  books in Thailand and Internationally. Her books include:

Thai Language Titiles

Tired Out But Not Fall down, Date: 5/2005, 224 Pages, Thai,  
The last Dhamma Boat, Date: 5/2005, 144 Pages, Thai,  (paperback)|
Observing moral precepts before it is too late, Date: 3/2008, 185 Pages, Thai,  (paper back)|
Techo Vipassana Meditation, a gate opening to Nirvana, 2010, 228 Pages, Thai,  (paperback) 
Vipassana Meditation to kill impurities, Date: 3/2011, 104 Pages, Thai,  (paperback)
Know It And Fight, Date: 5/2012, 216 Pages, Thai,  (paperback) 
Enlightened Layperson (Breaking The Code), 3/2016, 340 pages, Thai,  (paperback)
Enlightened Layperson II , Date: 7/2017, 426 pages, Thai,  (paperback)

English Language Titiles

Top Ideas in Buddhism and Famous Stories in Buddha's Time, Date: 09/2018, 208 Pages, English, 
Awaken from the Madness Date: 12/2018, 360 Pages, English,  (paperback)

Other works 

5000s Magazine is a Bilingual (Thai / English) High quality Magazine, developed for Thai and English speaking Buddhist and others to show Buddhists a representations of a modern Lifestyle which combines Buddhist moral values and Dhamma. The magazine through photos, interviews and stories gives readers an illustrations for living their life with morality and Buddhist faith, in a fast-paced modern thai society.

Controversy 

Acharavadee Wongsakon's voice of Buddhist morality has made her a controversial figure in Thailand. Acharavadee, publicly criticized some of Thai Buddhist clergy for not adhering to the strict Buddhist practices and conduct. This led to Acharavadee being disparaged by the media and by some of the male dominated Buddhist establishment. Thai culture prohibits women from criticizing monks, even if the criticism if well founded. The Thai Media have accused  Acharavadee of acting superior towards monks and alleged that  Acharavadee's monk students have bowed to their female teacher. The act of a Thai monk bowing to any female is considered taboo.

Acharavadee's Techo Vipassana Meditation technique has also been criticised by the media. Acharavadee's detractors argue that Acharvadee's Techo Vipassana meditation is not mentioned by name in any Buddhist historical accounts and they argue that this should disqualify the Techo technique and  discredit her, from teaching this method. Some have labeled Acharvadee's Techo Vipassana mediation centers as a cult.

Acharavadee's critics were silenced, when the National Office of Buddhism investigated and later endorsed  Acharvadee Wongsakon and her foundation, the Knowing Buddha Organization.

References

External links 
 knowingbuddha.org 
 techovipassana.org
 5000s.org

Acharavadee Wongsakon
Acharavadee Wongsakon
1965 births
Living people
Buddhist writers
Climate change